Krista Lee McCarville (born Krista Lee Scharf on November 10, 1982) is a Canadian curler from Thunder Bay, Ontario. McCarville is a four-time Northern Ontario junior champion, the 2003 Winter Universiade silver medallist, a four-time Ontario provincial champion, a four-time Northern Ontario provincial champion, and a two-time Canadian national medallist.

During her junior career, McCarville competed at four Canadian Junior Curling Championships for Team Northern Ontario, skipping three times (2000, 2001, and 2002), and playing second once (1998). Throughout her women's career, McCarville has competed in the Scotties Tournament of Hearts, the Canadian women's national curling championships, ten times, all as a skip. Before 2015, Northern Ontario did not compete at the Tournament of Hearts separately from Ontario; McCarville represented Ontario four times at the championships (2006, 2007, 2009, and 2010), winning bronze in 2010. She has skipped the Northern Ontario team six times (2016, 2017, 2019, 2020, 2022, and 2023), winning silver in 2016 and 2022. She has also competed in three Canadian Olympic Curling Trials, finishing in third place twice (2009 and 2021) and fifth place once (2017).

Career

Junior career
McCarville started curling at the age of ten. She represented Northern Ontario in four Canadian Junior Curling Championships. In 1998, she played second for Elaine Uhryn and finished with a 7–5 record, out of playoffs. She skipped her own team in 2000, 2001, and 2002, finishing with a 7–5 record in both 2000 and 2001, and a 6–6 record in 2002. In 2003, she and her team from Lakehead University represented Canada at the Winter Universiade in Tarvisio, Italy. The team won the silver medal, losing to Olga Jarkova's team from Russia in the final.

Women's career (2005–2013)
McCarville competed in her first women's provincial championship at the 2004 Ontario Scott Tournament of Hearts (before 2015, there was no separate Northern Ontario team at the national Tournament of Hearts), missing the playoffs. She also played third for Northern Ontario, skipped by her brother Joe Scharf, at the 2005 Canadian Mixed Curling Championship. They finished out of the playoffs. In 2005, she placed second at the 2005 Ontario Scott Tournament of Hearts, losing the final to Jenn Hanna.

In the 2005–06 curling season, McCarville competed in her first Grand Slam at the 2005 Casinos of Winnipeg Curling Classic (no longer a Grand Slam event), where her team placed third. In 2006, she won the 2006 Ontario Scott Tournament of Hearts, earning the right to represent Ontario at the 2006 Scott Tournament of Hearts. There, her team finished with a 4–7 record.

The following season, McCarville competed at the 2006 Trail Appliances Autumn Gold Curling Classic, finishing with a 4–3 record and out of the playoffs. She won the Ontario Tournament of Hearts again in 2007, and improved on her previous record at the 2007 Scotties Tournament of Hearts, finishing the round robin with a 6–5 record and losing the tie-breaker to Team Alberta, skipped by Cheryl Bernard.

During the 2007–08 season, McCarville placed third at the Casinos of Winnipeg Curling Classic. Her team placed second at the 2008 Ontario Scotties Tournament of Hearts, losing the final to Sherry Middaugh. She also made the final of the 2008 Players' Championship Grand Slam, which she lost to Amber Holland.

The next season, McCarville's team missed the playoffs at the 2008 Casinos of Winnipeg Classic and the 2008 Sobeys Slam. In 2009, she once again won the right to represent Ontario at the national Scotties Tournament of Hearts, for the third time in four years, after winning the 2009 Ontario Scotties Tournament of Hearts. At the 2009 Scotties Tournament of Hearts in Victoria, British Columbia, she again finished 6–5, missing the playoffs. At the 2009 Players' Championship, her team reached the quarterfinals, where they lost to Kelly Scott.

In 2009, McCarville and her team won the second qualifying spot at the Road to the Roar (the Canadian Olympic Curling Pre-Trials) in Prince George, British Columbia, earning them one of eight spots in Edmonton, Alberta for the Roar of the Rings, the 2009 Canadian Olympic Curling Trials. There, her team finished the round robin in a tie for third place. They played in the first tie-breaker against Team Lawton of Saskatoon. After beating Team Lawton, they moved on to the second tie-breaker against Team Amber Holland of Kronau, Saskatchewan, which they won. They then played in their third game of the day, the semi-final against Shannon Kleibrink from Calgary, and lost, ending their run at the Olympic Trials. A month later, the 2010 Ontario Scotties Tournament of Hearts took place at home for Team McCarville, in Thunder Bay. After going undefeated in the round robin, they earned an automatic bye into the provincial final, where they beat Team Horgan of Sudbury to finish the tournament undefeated. It was the first time in provincial history that a team went undefeated. With the win, she claimed her fourth trip to the Scotties Tournament of Hearts in five years. At the 2010 Scotties Tournament of Hearts in Sault Ste. Marie, Ontario, McCarville's Ontario team finished the round robin in a tie for fourth place. They defeated Team Manitoba, skipped by Jill Thurston, in a tie-breaker. Their next opponent was Team British Columbia (Kelly Scott) in the 3 vs. 4 page playoff game.  After beating Team B.C., they faced Prince Edward Island, skipped by Kathy O'Rourke, in the semi-final, losing 10–6. That season, her team also made the semi-final of the 2009 Manitoba Lotteries Women's Curling Classic.

McCarville competed in her first Canada Cup in 2010, losing the 3 vs. 4 page playoff game to Stefanie Lawton. She lost the final of the 2011 Ontario Scotties Tournament of Hearts to Rachel Homan's team from Ottawa. That season on the World Curling Tour, McCarville's team won the Molson Cash Spiel. The following season, she competed in two Grand Slams, making the semi-final of the 2011 Curlers Corner Autumn Gold Curling Classic and missing playoffs at the 2011 Manitoba Lotteries Women's Curling Classic. She also placed fourth at the 2012 Ontario Scotties Tournament of Hearts after losing the 3 vs. 4 page playoff game to Sherry Middaugh.

In the 2012–13 season, McCarville's team missed the playoffs at all three Grand Slams that they competed in (the 2012 Curlers Corner Autumn Gold Curling Classic, 2012 Manitoba Lotteries Women's Curling Classic, and 2012 Masters). Outside of Grand Slams, they won the 2012 Molson Cash Spiel on the World Curling Tour, defeating Becca Hamilton in the final. They lost the 3 vs. 4 page playoff game to Sherry Middaugh for the second year in a row at the 2013 Ontario Scotties Tournament of Hearts. On February 13, 2013, McCarville announced that she was taking a year or more off from curling to spend time with her two young children and to concentrate on her teaching career. She briefly returned to competitive curling upon earning a berth into the 2013 Canadian Olympic Curling Pre-Trials, where her team missed the playoffs.

Women's career (2015–present)
McCarville returned to competitive curling for the 2015–16 curling season, winning four events on the World Curling Tour: the 2015 Colonial Square Ladies Classic, Molson Cash Spiel, and Curl Mesabi Classic, and the 2016 U.S. Open of Curling. She highlighted her return by winning the 2016 Northern Ontario Scotties Tournament of Hearts in Timmins. She beat defending champion Tracy Fleury twice in the round robin, then scored three points in the seventh end of the final to defeat Team Fleury 8–4. McCarville finished undefeated in nine matches at the event. With the title, the team earned their right to compete in the 2016 Scotties Tournament of Hearts in Grand Prairie, Alberta, McCarville's fifth trip to the national tournament, but first representing Northern Ontario (only Ontario as a whole was represented at the Scotties prior to the inaugural 2015 Northern Ontario Scotties Tournament of Hearts). McCarville and her team of vice-skip Kendra Lilly, second Ashley Sippala, lead Sarah Potts, fifth Oye-Sem Won Briand and coach Lorraine Lang made it to the final of the 2016 Hearts, where they lost to Alberta's Chelsea Carey, settling for a silver medal. The team also competed at the 2016 Humpty's Champions Cup Grand Slam, finishing with a 1–3 record and out of the playoffs.

McCarville competed in two Grand Slams in the 2016–17 season, the 2016 Tour Challenge Tier 2, where she was the runner-up, and the 2016 Boost National, where she lost in a semi-final to Silvana Tirinzoni. She also won the 2017 Northern Ontario Scotties Tournament of Hearts, sending her team to represent Northern Ontario at the 2017 Scotties Tournament of Hearts. She led her team to an 8–3 round robin record, and defeated Chelsea Carey's Team Canada in the 3 vs. 4 page playoff, but then lost to Rachel Homan (Team Ontario) in the semi-final. The bronze medal game was a rematch against Carey, which she lost. 

Team McCarville won the first qualifying game at the 2017 Canadian Olympic Pre-trials, qualifying for the Olympic Trials in Ottawa. There, she led her team to a 4–4 record, missing the playoffs. On tour that season, they were finalists at the AMJ Campbell Shorty Jenkins Classic and semi-finalists at the Stu Sells Toronto Tankard. At the 2018 Northern Ontario Scotties Tournament of Hearts, she made the final, losing to Tracy Fleury.

In the 2018–19 season, McCarville's team won two events on the World Curling Tour, the KW Fall Classic and the Curl Mesabi Classic. She also competed at the 2018 Tour Challenge Tier 1 Grand Slam, finishing with a 1–3 record. She also won the 2019 Northern Ontario Scotties Tournament of Hearts, sending her team once again to represent Northern Ontario at the Scotties. There, she led her team to an 8–3 record, ending the championship pool in fourth place, earning her a spot in the playoffs. In the 3 vs. 4 game, McCarville lost to Team Ontario's Rachel Homan. At the Scotties, McCarville was named the Second Team All-Star skip based on her shooting percentage throughout the event.

McCarville's team once again won the Northern Ontario provincial championship the following year at the 2020 Northern Ontario Scotties Tournament of Hearts, which qualified them for the 2020 Scotties Tournament of Hearts in Moose Jaw, Saskatchewan. In her round robin win against Laura Walker's Team Alberta, McCarville shot a perfect game. Her team once again lost the 3 vs. 4 game to Ontario and Homan for the second year in a row. That season on tour, they defended their title at the Curl Mesabi Classic and were runners-up at the Royal LePage Women's Fall Classic and the Stroud Sleeman Cash Spiel.

The 2021 Northern Ontario provincial playdowns were cancelled due to the COVID-19 pandemic in Ontario. As the 2020 provincial champions, McCarville's team was given an automatic invitation to represent Northern Ontario at the 2021 Scotties Tournament of Hearts in Calgary. However, the team declined the invitation, citing family and work priorities.

Team McCarville had enough points to qualify for the 2021 Canadian Olympic Curling Pre-Trials. There, they went 5–1 through the round robin, qualifying for the playoffs. The team had two impressive come-from-behind wins in their two playoff games. In their first game against the Mackenzie Zacharias rink, they were down 7–3 heading into the tenth end, but scored four points, then stole a point in the extra end to win the match. In their second game against Jacqueline Harrison, the team gave up five points in the second end to trail 5–1, but rallied back to win the game 9–6. With the win, they qualified for the 2021 Canadian Olympic Curling Trials, held November 20 to 28 in Saskatoon, Saskatchewan. At the Trials, the team went through the round robin with a 4–4 record. This earned them a spot in the second tiebreaker where they defeated Kerri Einarson 4–3. In the semifinal, they lost 8–3 to Jennifer Jones, eliminating them from contention. The 2022 Northern Ontario Scotties Tournament of Hearts was cancelled due to the pandemic and Team McCarville were selected to represent their province at the national women's championship. At the 2022 Scotties Tournament of Hearts, McCarville led her rink to a 5–3 round robin record, enough to qualify for the playoffs. The team then won both of their seeding round games and defeated New Brunswick's Andrea Crawford in the 1 vs. 2 page playoff game to qualify for the final where they faced the Einarson rink. There, they could not keep their momentum going, losing the Scotties final 9–6. They wrapped up their season at the 2022 Players' Championship where they missed the playoffs.

Personal life
McCarville is a teacher at the Holy Family School in Thunder Bay. She is married to her 2005 Canadian Mixed Curling Championship teammate Mike McCarville and they have two children. Her brother Joe Scharf is also a curler; he played second on Al Hackner's Northern Ontario team at the 2001 Brier. Her parents are Linda and Ralph Scharf. She is a graduate of Westgate Collegiate & Vocational Institute and Lakehead University.

On the way back to Thunder Bay following the 2020 Scotties Tournament of Hearts, McCarville, teammate Ashley Sippala, and coach Rick Lang survived a plane crash in Dryden, Ontario.

Year-by-year statistics

Teams

Women's

Open and mixed

Grand Slam record

Former events

Notes

References

External links

1982 births
Canadian schoolteachers
Canadian women curlers
Curlers from Northern Ontario
Lakehead University alumni
Living people
Curlers from Thunder Bay
Universiade medalists in curling
Universiade silver medalists for Canada
Medalists at the 2003 Winter Universiade
Canada Cup (curling) participants